The Page Mystery is a 1917 American silent mystery film directed by Harley Knoles and starring Carlyle Blackwell, June Elvidge and Arthur Ashley.

Cast
 Carlyle Blackwell as Alan Winthrop 
 June Elvidge as Edith Strong 
 Frank Goldsmith as Montague Winthrop 
 Alec B. Francis as Hon. Charles Winthrop 
 Arthur Ashley as Ralph Cornwell 
 Pinna Nesbit as Laura Le Moyle 
 Al Hart as Saul Potter 
 Charles W. Charles as Simeon Jagger 
 Lila Chester as Kathleen Lorraine

References

Bibliography
 Langman, Larry. American Film Cycles: The Silent Era. Greenwood Publishing, 1998.

External links
 

1917 films
1917 drama films
1910s English-language films
American silent feature films
Silent American drama films
Films directed by Harley Knoles
American black-and-white films
World Film Company films
Films shot in Fort Lee, New Jersey
1910s American films